Kick-Ass, Kick Ass or Kickass may refer to:

Comics and franchise
 Kick-Ass (comics), original series also known as Kick-Ass: The Dave Lizewski Years, written by Mark Millar and illustrated by John Romita Jr.
 Kick-Ass (character), fictional character and main character of the original series
 Kick-Ass (film), a 2010 movie with the above character as the main character
 Kick-Ass: The Game, a video game based on the comics and film
 Kick-Ass: The New Girl, comic-book spinoff series

Music
 Kick-Ass (soundtrack), soundtrack from the 2010 film
 "Kick Ass (We Are Young)", song by Mika vs. RedOne, from the soundtrack
"Kick Ass" (Bryan Adams song)

Other uses
Kick-Ass (English debate team), informal name of Colegio de la Preciosa Sangre de Pichilemu's English debate team
Kick Ass (book), 1999 collection of columns by Carl Hiaasen
KickassTorrents, a defunct torrenting website

See also